Kitoba is a rural locality in the South Burnett Region, Queensland, Australia. In the  Kitoba had a population of 13 people.

History 
The locality takes its name from the Kitoba railway station name, which was named on 3 July 1926 by the Queensland Railways Department. The name Kitoba is thought to be an Aboriginal word referring to paint stone (possibly in connection with body painting). The station was previously known as Boolel, another Aboriginal word, meaning silver leafed ironbark tree.

The Anglican Church of the Holy Trinity was opened on 24 May 1957 by Archdeacon Richards. It was closed on 3 June 2005 by Assistant Bishop Nolan. The church was at 2272 Gayndah Road until 2007 when the church building was relocated to Cloyna State School.

Kitoba railway station was on the Windera railway line, now closed.

In the  Kitoba had a population of 13 people.

References 

South Burnett Region
Localities in Queensland